Madhavan Manohar (born 27 July 1987) is an Indian cricketer. He made his List A debut for Puducherry in the 2018–19 Vijay Hazare Trophy on 28 September 2018. He made his first-class debut for Puducherry in the 2018–19 Ranji Trophy on 22 December 2018.

References

External links
 

1987 births
Living people
Indian cricketers
Pondicherry cricketers
Place of birth missing (living people)
Wicket-keepers